Bernard John Green (c. 1962 – 8 September 2009) was a New Zealand rugby league player who represented New Zealand.

Playing career
Green played in the West Coast Rugby League competition and represented the West Coast.

In 1980 he played for the South Island in the New Zealand Rugby League's inter-district competition. He was then selected for the New Zealand squad that was touring Great Britain and France, becoming Kiwi number 556. He played in 5 games and scored 2 tries on tour, but did not play in any of the test matches.

In 1981 Green played for the South Island against the touring French side.

In 1986 Green was part of the Runanga side that won the West Coast premiership. In 1987 Runanga again won the West Coast title, and Green was part of the West Coast B side that won the South Island second division. Green was Runanga's player-coach in 1989 and again played for the West Coast.

Later years
A miner, Green died on 8 September 2006 during a rockfall at the Roa mine.

References

New Zealand rugby league players
New Zealand national rugby league team players
West Coast rugby league team players
New Zealand coal miners
Rugby league centres
Runanga players
South Island rugby league team players
2009 deaths